The meningeal branch of the vagus nerve is one of the first branches of the vagus nerve at the level of the superior ganglion. The neuron cell bodies reside within the superior ganglion and innervate the dura mater in the posterior cranial fossa of the base of the skull. The meningeal branch passes back into the skull through the jugular foramen.

References 

Vagus nerve